Burhanpur District is a district of Madhya Pradesh state in central India. The city of Burhanpur is the district headquarters.

Burhanpur District was created on 15 August 2003, from the southern portion of Khandwa District. The Tapti River flows through the district from east to west. The district is divided from Khandwa District on the north by the Satpura Range, which is also the divide between the Narmada River valley and the valley of the Tapti. The pass through the Satpuras that connects Burhanpur and Khandwa is one of the main routes connecting northern and southern India, and the Asirgarh fortress, which commands the pass, is known as the "Key to the Deccan".

The district is divided into two development blocks, Burhanpur and Khaknar, and three tehsils, Nepanagar, Burhanpur, and Khaknar. Burhanpur District is part of Indore Division.

Burhanpur is one of the most prominent places for the people of Dawoodi Bohra Community as Burhanpur houses one of the holiest and largest dargah (Dargh-E-Hakimi) of the community.

The old Burhanpur city is surrounded by gates giving it the appearance of a fort.

History 
The district was historically part of the Nimar and Khandesh regions, Khandesh subha (province), and was part of the various dynasties that rose and fell here. During the rise of Buddhism, the region was part of Avanti. The Mauryas ruled the region for a while, and were succeeded by the Satavahanas, Vakatakas. The region was part of the Gupta empire but after its collapse passed to Harshavardhana in 608 CE. Asirgarh and its surroundings were then ruled by the Tak Rajputs. In 1296, Alauddin Khilji conquered Asirgarh.

In the Mughal rule of India, this district was part of Khandesh province and Burhanpur was its capital city. In 1536, Humayun visited Burhanpur and forced the submission of Raja Ali Khan, also known as Adlil Shah, who controlled Burhanpur and Asirgarh. His son Bahadur Khan rebelled against Akbar, who soon arrived personally in the region to examine Asirgarh fort for himself. Shah Jahan stayed in the fort starting in 1630 for 2 years to conduct operations against the various Deccan powers, and there his beloved wife Mumtaz Mahal died and was initially buried in Burhanpur. In 1632, Shah Jahan left and left Mahabat Khan as viceroy of the Deccan.

Burhanpur was under the control of Aurangzeb in the late 17th century. In 1681, the Marathas made their first raid on Khandesh and sacked Burhanpur. In 1720, the Nizam of Hyderabad took over control of all Mughal possessions in the Deccan, including Burhanpur, but was constantly beset by the forces of Maratha Peshwa Balaji Rao I until it was ceded to the Marathas. The district was variously controlled by the Scindias or Holkars until in 1818, it came under British rule after the Third Anglo-Maratha War.

In 1857, Tatya Tope passed through the district during the rebellion. Various nationalist figures and freedom fighters arose in the Nimar region. After Independence the district became part of the newly-formed state of Madhya Pradesh.

Geography 
Burhanpur district is bordered by  Maharashtra state on the South, South-East, Khandwa district in North, Khargone district to the west. Tapi river flows through this district.

Demographics

According to the 2011 census Burhanpur District has a population of 757,847, roughly equal to the nation of Djibouti or the US state of Alaska. This gives it a ranking of 490th in India (out of a total of 640). Its population growth rate over the decade 2001-2011 was 19.23%. Burhanpur has a sex ratio of 900 females for every 1000 males, and a literacy rate of 65.28%. 34.35% of the populatoin lives in urban areas. Scheduled Castes and Scheduled Tribes made up 8.48% and 30.36% of the population respectively.

At the time of the 2011 Census of India, 26.97% of the population in the district spoke Marathi, 17.18% Hindi, 16.52% Urdu, 10.42% Korku, 6.23% Bareli, 5.33% Bhilali, 3.78% Banjari, 2.81% Bhili, 2.54% Gujarati, and 2.24% Nimadi as their first language.

Villages 
 

Chillara

References

External links 

Burhanpur District

 
Districts of Madhya Pradesh
2003 establishments in Madhya Pradesh